Abryutkovo is a rural locality (a village) in Yegoryevsk Urban Settlement of Yegoryevsky District, Moscow Oblast, Russia. The population was 2 .

Geography 
Abryutkovo is located 9 km east of Yegoryevsk (the district's administrative centre) by road. Akatovo is the nearest rural locality.

Ethnicity 
The village is inhabited by Russians.

References 

Rural localities in Moscow Oblast